

History 

The Lockheed Martin Engineering Management Program within the College of Engineering and Applied Science at the University of Colorado Boulder was initiated in 1987 with an endowment from Lockheed Martin to meet the needs of the high-tech industry in Colorado. The Program offers graduate education, both on campus and via distance learning, for technical professionals preparing to assume significant management responsibilities. Working professionals from companies across the nation and the world have graduated from the program including employees of high-tech companies such as Lockheed Martin, IBM, Maxtor, Hewlett-Packard, Ball Aerospace & Technologies Corp., Seagate, Raytheon, and Sun Microsystems.

Mission 
The mission of the program is to prepare full time working engineers and applied science professionals for early to mid-career technical management assignments. It is one of the aims of the program to provide flexible nd portable education supply using distance education platforms to reach as well local, national and international students. In collaboration with the industry, learning partnerships should be established to provide students with practical experience.

Engineering Management 
According to The American Society for Engineering Management (ASEM) "Engineering Management is the art and science of planning, organizing, allocating resources, and directing and controlling activities which have a technological component." ASEM goes on to note that "Engineering managers are distinguished from other managers by the fact that they possess both an ability to apply engineering principles and a skill in organizing and directing technical projects and people in technical jobs."

Graduate offerings 
A Masters of Engineering Degree in Engineering Management

Professional Certificates in core competence areas:
 Project Management
 Research & Development
 Performance Excellence in Technology Management
 Managing Applied Research in Technology
 Quality Systems for Product & Process Engineering
 Six Sigma
 Engineering Management

Professional resources 
 American Society for Engineering Management
 Canadian Society for Engineering Management
 ASME Engineering Management Journal
 IEEE Engineering Management Magazine
 Engineering Management Certification International

engineering management system